Jasin may refer to:
Jasin District in Malacca, Malaysia
Jasin, Malacca, a town in Jasin District
Jasin (federal constituency) in Malacca, Malaysia
Jasin, Kuyavian-Pomeranian Voivodeship, a village in north-central Poland
Jasin, Greater Poland Voivodeship a village in west-central Poland
Jasin, Tanzania a village in Tanzania also known as Jassini

See also
 Yasin (disambiguation)